Harry Rutherford Houston (May 20, 1878 – November 13, 1960) was a Virginia politician. He represented Elizabeth City County in the Virginia House of Delegates, and served as that body's Speaker from 1916 until 1920.

References

External links
 
 

1878 births
1960 deaths
Members of the Virginia House of Delegates
Speakers of the Virginia House of Delegates
People from Elizabeth City County, Virginia
Politicians from Hampton, Virginia
People from Fincastle, Virginia
20th-century American politicians